Lingue River is a river in the commune of Mariquina, southern Chile. It originates in the Valdivian Coast Range and flows westward where it empties in the Pacific Ocean at the town of Mehuín.

See also
List of rivers of Chile

Rivers of Chile
Rivers of Los Ríos Region